XHLC-FM/XELC-AM is a radio station in La Piedad, Michoacán. Broadcasting on 92.7 FM and 980 AM, XHLC is owned by the Guizar family and known as Radio Pía.

History
The concession for XELC-AM was awarded to Heriberto Guizar Castro in August 1945. The FM station was obtained in 1994.

While the concessionaire is known as Dual Estéreo, that musical format is now on XHLP-FM 89.9, owned by the same family.

References

Radio stations in Michoacán